Kazem Khani-ye Olya (also Romanized as Kāz̧em Khānī-ye ‘Olyā; also known as Kāz̧em Khānī) is a village in Heydariyeh Rural District, Govar District, Gilan-e Gharb County, Kermanshah Province, Iran. At the 2006 census, its population was 351, in 77 families.

References 

Populated places in Gilan-e Gharb County